Adorable is a 1933 American pre-Code musical comedy film directed by William Dieterle and starring Janet Gaynor as a princess who disguises herself in order to go out socially and have fun, falling in love with a "commoner" in the process. The film also stars Herbert Mundin and Sterling Holloway. It is a remake of the 1931 German romantic comedy Her Grace Commands.

Plot
Janet Gaynor plays a rebellious princess who must try to marry the man she loves, instead of the stuffy old prince her parents want her to marry. But will this ordinary man love her back once he finds out she's a princess?

Cast
Janet Gaynor as "Mitzi"
Henri Garat as Karl Conrad
C. Aubrey Smith as Prime Minister Von Heynitz
Herbert Mundin as Detective Pipac
Blanche Friderici as The Countess
Sterling Holloway as Emile (uncredited)

References

External links 
 
 

1933 films
1933 musical comedy films
1933 romantic comedy films
American musical comedy films
American romantic comedy films
American romantic musical films
1930s English-language films
Films directed by William Dieterle
Films with screenplays by Billy Wilder
American black-and-white films
Fox Film films
American remakes of German films
Films set in Europe
1930s romantic musical films
1930s American films